The 2009 Khan el-Khalili bombing was a terrorist attack that took place at 6:30 p.m. local time on 22 February 2009 in Khan el-Khalili, a souq in eastern Cairo, Egypt, killing a 17-year-old French teenager and injuring 24 other people. It was the first of the February 2009 Cairo terrorist attacks.

Attack details
The attack took place just after dark in front of a cafe crowded with people gathering to watch a televised football match. There were conflicting reports that the bomb was thrown from a balcony or from a motorcycle, but security officials reported that the bomb had exploded under a bench in a garden in the square. A second bomb failed to detonate and was defused.

A 17-year-old French girl, who was among a group of 54 teenagers from Levallois-Perret near Paris, was killed. Seventeen French, one German and three Saudi tourists, as well as three Egyptians, were wounded. Early reports suggest the explosive devices were "primitive".

Responsibility
According to security sources, there was no immediate claim of responsibility by any militant group, but three suspects had been taken into custody.

Reactions
Then French President Nicolas Sarkozy and then Prime Minister François Fillon condemned the attacks.

The attack has raised fear of the return of the Islamic militants groups to target Egypt's tourism industry. The attacks were also speculated to be linked to anger over Egypt's role in the Gaza conflict. The bombing caused concern for Cairo authorities, who saw the tourist industry devastated by bombings and shootings by Islamic militants in the 1990s.

Hotels' revenues and occupancy rates fell resulting in the dismissal of workers.

See also

2004 Sinai bombings
April 2005 Cairo terrorist attacks
2005 Sharm el-Sheikh attacks
2006 Dahab bombings
February 2009 Cairo terrorist attacks

References

Terrorist incidents in Egypt in 2009
Improvised explosive device bombings in Egypt
2000s in Cairo
Crime in Cairo
2009 murders in Egypt
Attacks in Egypt in 2009